Aldin Šetkić (born 21 December 1987) is a Bosnian professional tennis player.

Career statistics

Singles titles (14)

Doubles titles (16)

Singles performance timeline

''Current as far as the 2015 US Open.

References

External links
 
 
 

1987 births
Living people
Bosnia and Herzegovina expatriate sportspeople in Serbia
Bosnia and Herzegovina male tennis players
Tennis players from Belgrade
Sportspeople from Sarajevo